Clara Henriette ( Sanchez, born 20 September 1983 in Martigues) is a French professional track cyclist and is now the coach of the French national sprint squad. She won the Keirin World Championship on two occasions, 2004 and 2005.

She competed for France at the 2008 Summer Olympics and the 2012 Summer Olympics.

Palmarès 

 2002
 National Track Championships
 2nd, 500 m
 World Championships, Copenhagen
 2nd, Keirin

 2003
 National Track Championships
 1st, 500 m

 2004
 National Track Championships
 1st, 500 m
 World Championships, Melbourne
 1st, Keirin
 2004 World Cup
 2nd, Team Sprint, Moscow
 2nd, Team Sprint, Manchester
 3rd, 500 m, Sydney

 2005
 World Championships, Los Angeles
 1st, Keirin
 2005–2006 World Cup
 1st, Keirin, Manchester

 2006
 National Track Championships
 1st, 500 m
 2005–2006 World Cup
 2nd, Sprint, Los Angeles
 1st, Keirin, Los Angeles
 World Championships, Bordeaux
 2nd, Keirin
 2006–2007 World Cup
 3rd, Sprint, Sydney
 3rd, Team Sprint, Sydney

 2007
 2006–2007 World Cup
 2nd, Sprint, Los Angeles
 3rd, 500 m, Aigle
 1st, Keirin, Aigle
 2007–2008 World Cup
 3rd, Sprint Beijing
 2nd, Team Sprint, Beijing

 2008
1st Sprint, Grand Prix de Vitesse de Saint Denis 
2nd Sprint, Fenioux France Trophy 
 2007–2008 World Cup
 3rd, Team Sprint, Copenhagen
2013
1st Keirin, Revolution – Round 2, Glasgow

References

External links 
 
 
 
 

1983 births
Living people
French female cyclists
French track cyclists
Olympic cyclists of France
Cyclists at the 2008 Summer Olympics
Cyclists at the 2012 Summer Olympics
People from Martigues
UCI Track Cycling World Champions (women)
Sportspeople from Bouches-du-Rhône
Cyclists from Provence-Alpes-Côte d'Azur
Cycling coaches